Dolichyl-diphosphooligosaccharide—protein glycosyltransferase subunit 1 is an enzyme that in humans is encoded by the RPN1 gene.

This gene encodes a type I integral ribophorin membrane protein found only in the rough endoplasmic reticulum. The encoded protein is part of an N-oligosaccharyl transferase complex that links high mannose oligosaccharides to asparagine residues found in the Asn-X-Ser/Thr consensus motif of nascent polypeptide chains. This protein should not be confused with RPN1 of yeast, Drosophila, and C. elegans, which forms part of the regulatory subunit of the 26S proteasome and may mediate binding of ubiquitin-like domains to this proteasome.  The human version of this proteasome subunit is PSMD2.

References

Further reading